The following is a partial list of characters in the novel Don Quixote de la Mancha by Miguel de Cervantes Saavedra.

Main characters

 Don Quixote, a Spanish gentleman of La Mancha Alonso Quijano (or Quesada, or Quijada), who believes himself and acts as a knight-errant as described in various medieval books of chivalry, riding his horse Rocinante.
 Sancho Panza (or Zancas), Don Quixote's squire. He is uneducated and unable to read, but he knows numerous proverbs and rides a donkey.

Other characters
 Antonia, Alonso Quijano's niece, a woman under twenty; she urges both the priest and the barber to burn all of Alonso's books
 Antonio, a goatherder, who plays a song for Don Quixote on the rebec (in Book I, Chapter 11)
 Avellaneda, author of the false Second Part of Don Quixote who is frequently referred to in Cervantes' second part.
 Cardenio, an honorable young man who dwells in misery and madness in Sierra Morena, driven there by the apparent infidelity of his beloved Lucinda and the treachery of Duke Ferdinand (Fernando). Shakespeare's lost play The History of Cardenio may have been based on his story.
 Ferdinand (Fernando), a young and reckless nobleman, who promises to marry Dorotea, but leaves her and instead takes Lucinda from Cardenio, but eventually repents (since his promise to Dorotea is legally binding), returns Lucinda to Cardenio and marries Dorotea.
 Dorotea (Dorothea), a modest young woman, whom Ferdinand promises to marry, seduces, and then leaves. She remains loyal to Ferdinand despite his reckless behavior. Like Cardenio, she hid out in the mountains, but dressed as a young man. Pretended to be Princess Micomicona to get Don Quixote to leave the mountains.
 Cide Hamete Benengeli is the fictional Moorish author created by Cervantes and listed as Don Quixote's chronicler.  Cide is a title like sir, meaning My Lord; Hamete is the Spanish form of the Arabic name Hamed, he who praises; and Benengeli is a comical invention of Cervantes that suggests aubergine-eater via the Spanish berenjena or aubergine, popularly considered to be the favorite food in Toledo at the time of the novel.
 Friston the magician (El Sabio Frestón), an imaginary character who Quixote imagines as the thief of his books and the enchanter of the windmills.
 Dulcinea of El Toboso, the woman Don Quixote fancies his lady love; her real name is Aldonza Lorenzo, and he has never actually met her.
 Ginés de Pasamonte a.k.a. Ginesillo de Parapilla, a criminal freed by Don Quixote. He later reappears as Maese Pedro, a puppet-showman who claims that he can talk to his monkey.
 Grisóstomo, a shepherd who dies of a broken heart after his declaration of love is spurned by Marcela, a wealthy orphan girl who dresses as a shepherdess and lives in the woods to commune with nature, and whose beauty attracts dozens of suitors. His friends/defenders include Ambrosio, a shepherd, and Vivaldo, a hidalgo who saves Grisóstomo's poems of unrequited love from the fire
 Marcela, a young woman who escapes her suiters by becoming a shepherdess. At Grisóstomo's funeral, she rejects that she is to blame, stating that her beauty does not oblige her to accept the affections of any of the men who are enraptured by her. 
 Juan Haldudo, a peasant, and Andres (Andrés), his mistreated servant.
 Maria Zoraida, the daughter of a wealthy merchant in Algiers who is a Christian convert.  She escaped Algiers with some captured Christians via boat.
 Maritornes, a half-blind servant girl at the inn in which Quixote stayed in. She is unwittingly involved in a brawl in the middle of the night through a complex series of misunderstandings.
 Montesinos and Durandarte, heroes whom Quixote claims to have seen when he descended into a cave.
 Nicholas the barber (Maese Nicolás), Don Quixote's friend
 Pedro Alonso, a neighbor of Quixote.
 Pedro Perez the priest, who, along with Antonia, orders nearly all of Don Quixote's books burnt in hopes of curing him of his delusions (I:6)
 Ricote, a Morisco friend of Sancho, banned from Spain, but returned as a German pilgrim. Father of Ana Félix, a fervent Christian maid, who separately returns from Berbery to Spain.
 Teresa (also named Juana or Joana) Panza the wife of Sancho Panza, who thinks that Sancho will become rich through being a squire, but does not think he should be a governor.  
Sanchica (also named Mari Sancha), the daughter of Sancho Panza who is beautiful, but works hard and is poor. 
 Bachelor Samson Carrasco, Don Quixote's friend who jousts with him disguised as a rival knight, in an effort to get him to return home.
The Knight of the Wood (also known as The Knight of the Mirrors) Bachelor Samson in disguise as a knight. he lost the joust with Don Quixote the first time and won it the second time. Once he won, Don Quixote had to stop being a knight for a year and Don Quixote died of depression.   
 Don Sancho de Azpeitia, a Biscayne squire who cuts part of Don Quixote's ear off in a sword fight (I:9)
 Ruy Perez, a Spanish sailor who was held captive by the moors and escaped back to Spain with the help of Zoraida, also called Maria, a Moorish young lady who decided to convert to Christianity.
 Juan Pérez de Viedma, the brother of Ruy Perez; Clara de Viedma, the daughter of Juan Pérez; Don Luis, a young man in love with Clara de Viedma
 Tom Cecial (Tomé Cecial), a neighbor of Sancho and the squire of Samson Carrasco, when he is disguised as "The Knight of the Mirrors".
 Don Diego de Miranda, a learned hidalgo who hosts Quixote and Sancho at his home; Don Lorenzo, his son, an aspiring poet.
 Altisidora, a young woman in the court of the Duchess, who pretends that she loves Quixote.
 Doña Rodriguez de Grijalba, a duenna in the court of the Duchess; Tosilos, a lackey sent by the Duchess to fight with Quixote
 Roque Guinart, a fictional version of the Catalan bandit Perot Rocaguinarda.
 Don Antonio Moreno, Quixote's host in Barcelona.
 Lothario, Anselmo, Camilla and Leonela are characters in "The Ill-Advised Curiosity", a story embedded in the first volume of Quixote.

Unnamed but important characters 
 The Duke and The Duchess, a couple of Aragonese aristocrats who invite Don Quixote and Sancho to their castle, where they "amuse" themselves by playing all sorts of humiliating pranks on them.
 Don Quixote's housekeeper, who carries out the book-burning with alacrity and relish.
 The innkeeper who puts Don Quixote up for the night and agrees to dub him a "knight," partly in jest and partly to get Don Quixote out of his inn more quickly, only for Don Quixote to return later, with a large number of people in tow. His wife and daughter also play pranks on Don Quixote.
 The innkeeper's wife who does not enjoy the presence of Don Quixote and Sancho, but likes to deceive them.
 The innkeeper's daughter loves the books of chivalry and talks the priest into reading one of the books. She also loves to prank Don Quixote and Sancho Panza.

Characters from chivalry romances
Don Quixote interprets in his delirium everyday items as fantastic props from the characters of chivalry romances:
 Mambrino's helmet. Actually a barber basin.
 Fierabras' balm. A concoction that would heal any wound but actually has ill effects on Don Quixote and Sancho.

See also

Don Quixote
Cultural influence of Don Quixote

 
Lists of fictional characters